Cerautola decellei is a butterfly in the family Lycaenidae. It is found in the Democratic Republic of the Congo.

References

Butterflies described in 1956
Poritiinae
Butterflies of Africa
Endemic fauna of the Democratic Republic of the Congo